Myothit Township is a township of Magway District in the Magway Division of Myanmar.  The principal town is Myothit.

Townships of Magway Region